Edmund Breon (born Iver Edmund de Breon MacLaverty; 12 December 1882 – 24 June 1953) was a Scottish film and stage actor. He appeared in more than 130 films between 1907 and 1952.

Life and career 
Born in Hamilton, South Lanarkshire, Breon began in John Hare's touring company and later played on the West End stage and in Glasgow, gaining prominence. According to his grandson, film editor, Breon "started out at the turn of the century doing silent pictures in France. Vampire movies", so it is reasonably certain that MacLaverty is indeed the actor who appeared under the name Edmond Bréon in many Gaumont films 1907-1922 including, most famously, playing the part of Inspector Juve for Louis Feuillade in the ground-breaking Fantômas series. He did also appear in a small part in the 1915-1916 Feuillade series Les vampires although this is not, as his grandson supposes, a horror film. He returned to Britain where he made the film A Little Bit of Fluff (1928) then went to Canada in 1929 and worked on the land. A year later he emigrated to the United States and gained his first big American film part in The Dawn Patrol (1930). Breon appeared in a mixture of British and American films over the following two decades. He also appeared on stage in the West End production of the comedy Spring Meeting in 1938.

A 1949 newspaper article noted that Breon's "career has been interrupted by serious illness and an accident which kept him idle for two years."

His grandson also recalls that he played the role of Dr. Ambrose in Howard Hawks’ The Thing from Another World (1951). 

Breon died in Cork, Ireland, on 24 June 1953.

Selected filmography

L'homme aimanté (1907)
Fantômas - À l'ombre de la guillotine (1913) - Inspector Juve
Fantômas (1913) - Inspector Juve
Le mort qui tue (1913) - Inspector Juve
Fantomas: The Mysterious Finger Print (1914) - Inspector Juve
Le Faux Magistrat (1914) - Inspector Juve
Severo Torelli (1914)
La petite Andalouse (1915) - Don Benigno - Lawyer
Les vampires (1915) - Satanas' Secretary
L'énigme (1919)
Barrabas (1919) - Lucius
L'écuyère (1922)
A Little Bit of Fluff (1928) - John Ayres
The Dawn Patrol (1930) - Lieut. Phipps
Raffles (1930) - Harry - Lord & Lady Melrose's Friend (uncredited)
On Approval (1930) - Richard Wemys
The Love Habit (1931) - Alphonse Dubois
Uneasy Virtue (1931) - Harvey Townsend
Born to Love (1931) - Tom Kent (uncredited)
Chances (1931) - The General
I Like Your Nerve (1931) - Clive Lattimer
Women Who Play (1932) - Rachie Wells
Wedding Rehearsal (1932) - Lord Fleet
Leap Year (1932) - Jack Debrant
No Funny Business (1933) - Edward
Waltz Time (1933) - Judge Bauer
Three Men in a Boat (1933) - George
The Private Life of Don Juan (1934) - Cardona, the Playwright, as Playwrights Go
The Scarlet Pimpernel (1934) - Col. Winterbottom
Mister Cinders (1934) - Sir George Lancaster
Royal Cavalcade (1935) - Minor Role (uncredited)
Night Mail (1935) - Lord Ticehurst
The Divine Spark (1935) - Rossini
She Shall Have Music (1935) - Freddie Gates
Love in Exile (1936) - Baron Zarroy
Strangers on Honeymoon (1936) - Sir Gregory
French Leave (1937) - Col. Root
Keep Fit (1937) - Sir Augustus Marks
Return of the Scarlet Pimpernel (1937) - Colonel Winterbottom
Premiere (1938) - Morel
Owd Bob (1938) - Lord Meredale
A Yank at Oxford (1938) - Captain Wavertree
Almost a Honeymoon (1938) - Aubrey Lovitt
Dangerous Medicine (1938) - Totsie Mainwaring
Crackerjack (1938) - Tony Davenport
Luck of the Navy (1938) - Admiral Maybridge
Many Tanks Mr. Atkins (1938) - Colonel
The Outsider (1939) - Dr. Ladd
Goodbye, Mr. Chips (1939) - Colonel Morgan
It Happened to One Man (1940) - Adm. Drayton
The Lodger (1944) - Manager (uncredited)
Gaslight (1944) - General Huddleston
The Hour Before the Dawn (1944) - Freddy Merritt
The White Cliffs of Dover (1944) - Major Rupert Bancroft (uncredited)
Casanova Brown (1944) - Mr. Drury
Our Hearts Were Young and Gay (1944) - Guide (uncredited)
An American Romance (1944) - (uncredited)
The Woman in the Window (1944) - Dr. Michael Barkstane
The Man in Half Moon Street (1945) - Sir Humphrey Brandon
The Corn Is Green (1945) - Bit Part (uncredited)
Saratoga Trunk (1945) - McIntyre (uncredited)
Devotion (1946) - Sir John Thornton (uncredited)
Dressed to Kill (1946) - Julian 'Stinky' Emery
The Imperfect Lady (1947) - Lord Chief Justice
Forever Amber (1947) - Lord Redmond
Julia Misbehaves (1948) - Jamie (uncredited)
Master of Lassie (1948) - Jamie Soutar
Enchantment (1948) - Uncle Bunny
Rope of Sand (1949) - Chairman
Challenge to Lassie (1949) - Magistrate
The Thing from Another World (1951) - Dr. Ambrose (uncredited)
At Sword's Point (1952) - Queen's Chamberlain

References

External links

1882 births
1951 deaths
Scottish male film actors
Scottish male silent film actors
People from Hamilton, South Lanarkshire
Place of death missing
20th-century Scottish male actors
British emigrants to the United States